Essex North was a federal electoral district represented in the House of Commons of Canada from 1883 to 1925. It was located in the province of Ontario. This riding was created in 1882 when Essex riding was divided between Essex North and Essex South.

It initially consisted of the townships of West Sandwich, East Sandwich, Maidstone, Rochester and West Tilbury, the towns of Sandwich and Windsor, and the village of Belle River in the county of Essex.

In 1903, it was redefined to exclude the township of West Tilbury and include the township of Sandwich South, and the town of Walkerville.

In 1914, it was redefined to include the town of Objibway, and the village of Ford City.

The electoral district was abolished in 1924 when it was redistributed between Essex East and Essex West ridings.

Election results

|}

|}

|}

|}

|}

|}

|}

On Mr. Sutherland's being named Justice of the High Court, Exchequer Division and Puisne Judge, High Court Division, Supreme Court of Canada, 21 October 1909:
 

|}

|}

|}

|}

On Mr. Kennedy being named Minister of Railways and Canals, 29 December 1921:

|}

On Mr. Kennedy's death, 17 January 1923:

|}

See also 

 List of Canadian federal electoral districts
 Past Canadian electoral districts

External links 
Riding history from the Library of Parliament

Former federal electoral districts of Ontario